Farha Manzoor (born 17 August 1975) is a Pakistani politician who was a Member of the Provincial Assembly of the Punjab, from May 2013 to May 2018.

Early life 
She was born 17 August 1975 in Vehari.

Political career

She was elected to the Provincial Assembly of the Punjab as a candidate of the Pakistan Muslim League (N) on a reserved seat for women in 2013 Pakistani general election.

References

Living people
Punjab MPAs 2013–2018
1975 births
Pakistan Muslim League (N) politicians
Women members of the Provincial Assembly of the Punjab
21st-century Pakistani women politicians